Harold William Peel (June 21, 1879 – November 28, 1944) was a Canadian early professional ice hockey player with the Pittsburgh Keystones of the Western Pennsylvania Hockey League. He was a member of the Keystones 1902 WPHL championship team.

Biography
Harry Peel was one of the first openly professional hockey players. In 1902 he disclosed that he was paid $35 a week to play for the Pittsburgh Keystones. This was a violation of the team's amateur status. As a result, both Canadian and U.S. officials disallowed all amateur teams to play against the Keystones and Peel's amateur status was revoked by the Ontario Hockey Association. He issued two appeals that were rejected on December 10, 1903 and again on November 30, 1904.

However, professional hockey expanded and the WPHL embraced its new professional status. As a result, the league expanded to four teams by adding the Pittsburgh Victorias, and openly enticed the best talent it could, including future Hockey Hall of Fame members Hod and Bruce Stuart from the Quebec Bulldogs, Alf Smith from the Ottawa Hockey Club and Riley Hern from the Stratford Legionnaires.

Peel died in November 1944 and is buried at Mount Pleasant Cemetery and Crematorium in his hometown of London, Ontario.

References
Before the NHL: Western Pennsylvania Hockey League, International Professional Hockey League ticky-box.com
Is Pittsburgh the Birthplace of Professional Hockey? pittsburghhockey.net

Notes

1879 births
Canadian ice hockey defencemen
Pittsburgh Keystones (ice hockey) players
Year of death missing
Ice hockey people from Ontario